Hippopotamidae is a family of stout, naked-skinned, and semiaquatic artiodactyl mammals, possessing three-chambered stomachs and walking on four toes on each foot. While they resemble pigs physiologically, their closest living relatives are the cetaceans. They are formally referred to as hippopotamids.

There are two living species of hippopotamid in two genera; the pygmy hippo, Choeropsis liberiensis of the forests of west Africa, and the common hippo, Hippopotamus amphibius. The term hippopotamus can also be applied to hippopotamids in general, although it is most frequently used for the common hippo and its respective genus.

Characteristics 
Hippopotamids are large mammals, with short, stumpy legs, and barrel-shaped bodies. They have large heads, with broad mouths, and nostrils placed at the top of their snouts. Like pigs, they have four toes, but unlike pigs, all of the toes are used in walking. Hippopotamids are unguligrade, although, unlike most other such animals, they have no hooves, instead using a pad of tough connective tissue on each foot. Their stomachs have three chambers, but they are not true ruminants.

The living species are smooth-skinned and lack both sebaceous glands and sweat glands. The outer epidermis is relatively thin, so hippos dehydrate rapidly in dry environments.

Both the incisors and canines are large and tusk-like, although the canine tusks are by far the larger. The tusks grow throughout life. The postcanine teeth are large and complex, suited for chewing the plant matter that comprises their diets. The number of incisors varies even within the same species, but the general dental formula is given in the table below:

Evolution 

The hippopotamids are descended from the anthracotheres, a family of semiaquatic and terrestrial artiodactyls that appeared in the late Eocene, and are thought to have resembled small- or narrow-headed hippos.  The hippos split off from the anthracotheres some time during the Miocene. The oldest records of Hippopotamidae are from Afro-Arabia and date to the late Miocene, approximately 7.4 million years ago, expanding into Eurasia around 6 million years ago. After the appearance of the hippopotamids, the remaining anthracotheres went into a decline brought about by a combination of climatic change and competition with their descendants, until the last genus, Merycopotamus, died out in the early Pliocene of India.

There were once many species of hippopotamid, but only two survive today: Hippopotamus amphibius, and Choeropsis liberiensis. They are the last survivors of two major evolutionary lineages, the hippos proper and the pygmy hippos, respectively; these lineages could arguably be considered subfamilies, but their relationship to each other – apart from being fairly distant relatives – is not well resolved.

The enigmatic Miocene Kenyapotamus is insufficiently known to be assigned a place in the hippo phylogeny with any degree of certainty. In addition, the genus Hexaprotodon, in a sense now restricted to an extinct group of animals once living around the northern and northeastern Indian Ocean, which formerly included most ancient hippos, has turned out to be paraphyletic.

Taxonomy 
Hippopotamidae's placement within Artiodactyla can be represented in the following cladogram:

Analogous structures 
The lower canine teeth of hippopotamids are similar in function and structure to the tusks of elephants. While hippopotamids and elephants are only very distantly related within the Mammalia, the lower canine teeth of both groups are long and have a slight curve, and species of both families use this structure when fighting.

Species 
The systematics and taxonomy used here mostly follows a review by J.-R. Boisserie
and the American Society of Mammalogists.

Recent species 

 Genus Hippopotamus – true hippopotamuses
 Hippopotamus amphibius – hippopotamus (Africa)
†Hippopotamus lemerlei – Lemerle's dwarf hippopotamus (Madagascar; Holocene)
†Hippopotamus madagascariensis – Madagascan dwarf hippopotamus (Madagascar; Holocene)

 Genus Choeropsis – pygmy hippopotamuses
 Choeropsis liberiensis – pygmy hippopotamus (west Africa)

Fossil species 
 Genus Hippopotamus – true hippopotamuses
 †Hippopotamus antiquus – mainland Europe & British Isles; Pleistocene
 †Hippopotamus creutzburgi – Crete; Pleistocene
 †Hippopotamus minor – Cyprus; Pleistocene to Holocene
 †Hippopotamus melitensis – Malta; Pleistocene
 †Hippopotamus pentlandi – Sicily; Pleistocene
 †Hippopotamus laloumena – Madagascar; Holocene
 †Hippopotamus gorgops – Africa and mainland Europe; Late Miocene–Middle Pleistocene
 Tentatively placed into Hippopotamus:
 †Hippopotamus aethiopicus – Kenya & Ethiopia; Pliocene -Pleistocene
 †Hippopotamus afarensis – formerly genus Trilobophorus
 †Hippopotamus behemoth – Israel, Early Pleistocene
 †Hippopotamus kaisensis – Central Africa; Pliocene
 †Hippopotamus sirensis – Morocco & Algeria; Pleistocene
 Genus Hexaprotodon – hexaprotodons or Asian hippopotamuses
 †Hexaprotodon bruneti – Ethiopia; Pliocene
 †Hexaprotodon coryndoni – Ethiopia; Pliocene
 †Hexaprotodon crusafonti – Spain; Late Miocene (syn. Hexaprotodon primaevus)
 †Hexaprotodon hipponensis – Algeria
 †Hexaprotodon imagunculus – Uganda and Congo; Pliocene
 †Hexaprotodon iravaticus – Myanmar; Pliocene – Pleistocene
 †Hexaprotodon karumensis – Kenya and Eritrea; Pleistocene
 †Hexaprotodon namadicus – India; (possibly same as Hex. palaeindicus)
 †Hexaprotodon palaeindicus – India;
 †Hexaprotodon pantanellii – Italy; Pliocene
 †Hexaprotodon protamphibius – Kenya and Chad; Pliocene
 †Hexaprotodon siculus –
 †Hexaprotodon sivajavanicus – Indonesia
 †Hexaprotodon sivalensis – India
 †Hexaprotodon sp. (undescribed) – Myanmar
 Genus Archaeopotamus – formerly included in Hexaprotodon
 †Archaeopotamus harvardi –  Arabian Peninsula and Central Africa; Miocene – Pliocene
 †Archaeopotamus lothagamensis – Kenya; Miocene
 One or two undescribed species
 Genus Saotherium – formerly included in Hexaprotodon
 † Chad; Pliocene

Footnotes

References

Further reading
 
 

 
Mammal families
Langhian first appearances
Extant Miocene first appearances
Taxa named by John Edward Gray